Cicadetta montana (also known as the New Forest cicada) is a species of Cicadetta found  throughout Europe and in parts of Asia.

It is regarded as endangered over large parts of Europe, and has vanished from several areas in Western Europe.
It is the only cicada species native to England and Finland (Åminneforss in Pohja).

The adult females inject their eggs into the stems of food plants, and, when the larvae emerge, they burrow underground and as nymphs feeding on root sap. These underground cycles may last many years, differing for each species.

Females have a body measuring about 50 mm in length, with the males being much smaller. It has transparent wings with prominent veins, folded over the back when at rest, and a dark slate-grey or black body with dull orange rings around the abdomen. The legs are marked with dull orange as are the leading edges of the wings (costae).

As with all cicadas, the males produce the shrill, buzzing calls by rapidly flexing drumhead-like membranes, while the females are limited to producing clicks. 
The call of C montana sounds like static hiss to the unaided human ear and is sustained with relatively short lulls at irregular intervals. Their shrilling was venerated by the ancient Greeks, but detested by Virgil.

Food plants
Betula pendula (European white birch)	
Betula pubescens (downy birch)	
Corylus avellana (common filbert)
Crataegus monogyna (common hawthorn)	
Fagus sylvatica (European beech)
Pteridium aquilinum (northern bracken fern)
Quercus robur (pedunculate oak)
Ulex europaeus (common gorse)

Taxonomic history
In 1772, Scopoli described and named the type specimen from Slovenia as Melampsalta montana, and this was later changed to Cicadetta montana. It has turned out to be not a single taxon, but a complex of closely related species distinguishable by their songs. Using this method of differentiation, at least 10 species have been separated from the complex. Classification by calls has led to three main groups being proposed which largely correspond with the clades suggested by DNA analyses – one new species not fitting in the proposed scheme.

Synonyms
Melampsalta montana Scopoli, 1772
Cicadetta flavofenestrata Goeze, 1778
C. schafferi Gmelin, 1780
C. pygmaea Olivier, 1790
C. dimidiata Fabricius, 1803
C. anglica Samouelle, 1819
C. parvula Walker, 1850
C. saxonica Hartwig, 1857
C. megerlei Fieber, 1876
C. longipennis Fieber, 1876

New Forest cicada project
C. montana has not been seen or heard anywhere in Britain since 2000. In 2013, in an attempt to locate remaining specimens, developers have written application software for smartphones, enabling users to listen to sound frequencies beyond the normal human range. Up to December 2015, over 3,000 people have downloaded the ″Hunt for the New Forest Cicada app″ without success in Britain, although the app has recorded the insect in Slovenia. From 2016 onwards, 100 autonomous acoustic monitoring devices have been deployed each year throughout the New Forest.

C. montana also disappeared between 1941 and 1961, so their current absence may be part of a cycle.

References

External links
 A review of the genera of Australian cicadas - M. S. Moulds

Cicadettini
Hemiptera of Europe
New Forest
Insects described in 1772
Taxa named by Giovanni Antonio Scopoli